Cornet Island is an island  northeast of Milnes Island along the west side of the Grandidier Channel, in the Biscoe Islands. It was first charted by the British Graham Land Expedition of 1934–37 under John Rymill. The name, given by the UK Antarctic Place-Names Committee in 1959, is descriptive of the island's shape when seen from the air.

See also 
 List of Antarctic and sub-Antarctic islands

References 

Islands of the Biscoe Islands